Anton Bidzilya (born 7 June 2000) is a Hungarian football player who plays as an attacking midfielder for DEAC.

Club statistics

References

2000 births
Sportspeople from Uzhhorod
Hungarian people of Ukrainian descent
Living people
Hungarian footballers
Hungary youth international footballers
Association football midfielders
MTK Budapest FC players
Békéscsaba 1912 Előre footballers
Kaposvári Rákóczi FC players
Nemzeti Bajnokság I players
Nemzeti Bajnokság II players
Nemzeti Bajnokság III players